This is a list of films which placed number one at the weekend box office for the year 2012 in Poland.

2013
2013 in Poland
Poland